Teuvo Veli-Pekka Vilen (born 26 November 1953) is a Finnish footballer. He competed in the men's tournament at the 1980 Summer Olympics.

References

External links
 

1953 births
Living people
Finnish footballers
Association football defenders
FC Haka players
Finland international footballers
Olympic footballers of Finland
Footballers at the 1980 Summer Olympics
People from Valkeakoski
Sportspeople from Pirkanmaa